The Copa Federación was a Peruvian football championship to be contested by the winners of Primera División and the Copa Inca.

History
Due to the 2011 Copa América, at the end of the 2011 Torneo Descentralizado's first round, the Torneo Intermedio (Copa Inca) was played, with the participation of the 16 teams of the Primera División, 5 teams of the Segunda División, and 14 teams of the Copa Perú. The winners were José Gálvez and qualified for the 2012 Copa Federación against the 2011 Torneo Descentralizado champion.

Champions

Titles by club

External links
Soccerway.com
Peruvian Football League News 

Football competitions in Peru
Peru
Defunct sports competitions in Peru